Maxey Whitehead (born June 15, 1981) is an American voice actress who provided voices for a number of English-language versions of Japanese anime films at Funimation. She is generally cast as young boys or young girls; her most notable roles are as Alphonse Elric from Fullmetal Alchemist: Brotherhood, Dende from Dragon Ball Z Kai, Czeslaw Meyer from Baccano!, and Crona from Soul Eater.

Biography

Whitehead was working as a stage actor when her friend R. Bruce Elliott was planning to audition for Romeo × Juliet and invited her along. She auditioned and landed the voice actor part of Antonio. She also voiced Ellis in the girls-with-guns anime El Cazador de la Bruja and voices the main character Tsukimi Kurashita in Princess Jellyfish.

Whitehead was roommates with fellow voice actress Emily Neves in college. She has stated that her favorite character to voice so far in her career has been Crona from Soul Eater.

Dubbing roles

Anime

 A Certain Magical Index the Movie: The Miracle of Endymion – Ladylee Tangleroad
 A Certain Scientific Railgun – Aomi Yanagisako
 Baccano! – Czeslaw Meyer
 Birdy the Mighty: Decode – Shoko Kagami
 Black Butler – Richard
 Case Closed: The Phantom of Baker Street – Hiroki Sawada, Noah's Ark
 Casshern Sins – Hoto (Ep. 17), Toro (Ep. 11)
 Corpse Princess – Shota
 Darker than Black – Maki
 Death Parade – Jiro (Ep. 5)
 Dimension W – Elizabeth Greenhough-Smith
 Dragon Ball Z Kai – Dende (Young)
 El Cazador de la Bruja – Ellis
 Fairy Tail – Lullaby
 Free! – Rin Matsuoka (Young)
 Fullmetal Alchemist: Brotherhood – Alphonse Elric
 Fullmetal Alchemist: The Sacred Star of Milos – Alphonse Elric
 Gunslinger Girl -Il Teatrino – Pinocchio (Young)
 Hero Tales – Hosei Meitoku (Young)
 Hetalia: Axis Powers – Sealand
 Kamisama Kiss 2 – Kurama (Young)
 Kaze no Stigma – Kazuma Yagami (Young)
 Last Exile: Fam, the Silver Wing – Johann (young)
 Level E – Doris, Kyoko Mikihisa (Young)
 Michiko & Hatchin – Blackie (Eps. 3-4)
 My Hero Academia: Heroes Rising – Katsuma Shimano 
 Ōkami-san and her Seven Companions – Chutaro Nezumi (Ep. 8)
 One Piece – Akibi (Young)
 Phantom ~Requiem for the Phantom~ – Duke Stone
 Ping Pong: The Animation – Yutaka "Peco" Hoshino (Young)
 Princess Jellyfish – Tsukimi Kurashita
 Romeo × Juliet – Antonio
 Rosario + Vampire Capu2 – Lilith
 The Sacred Blacksmith – Doris
 Sekirei – Shiina
 Sengoku Basara: Samurai Kings –  Mori Ranmaru
 Sgt. Frog – Poyon
 Shiki – Hiromi Murasako
 Soul Eater – Crona
 Space Dandy – Erssime (Ep. 18)
 Spice and Wolf II – Lunt
 Strike Witches 2 – Fernandia Malvezzi (Ep. 12)
 Summer Wars – Kazuma Ikezawa
 Tokyo Ghoul √A – Juuzou Suzuya
 Tsubasa Tokyo Revelations – Kakyo Kazuki

Video Games
Dragon Ball Z: Ultimate Tenkaichi – Dende
Dragon Ball Xenoverse 2 – Dende
Dragon Ball Z: Kakarot – Dende

References

External links

1981 births
Actresses from Texas
Place of birth missing (living people)
American voice actresses
Living people